General elections were held in Liechtenstein on 3 February 1978. The result was a victory for the Patriotic Union, which won 8 of the 15 seats in the Landtag, despite the Progressive Citizens' Party receiving more votes. Voter turnout was 95.7%, although only male citizens were allowed to vote.

Results

References

Liechtenstein
1978 in Liechtenstein
Elections in Liechtenstein
February 1978 events in Europe